Liang Wang (born 1980) is an American oboist. In 2006, he joined the New York Philharmonic as the principal oboe, The Alice Tully Chair.

About 
Wang was born in Qing Dao, China, and studied at the Central Conservatory of Music in Beijing and the Idyllwild Arts Academy in California. He received his bachelor's degree from Philadelphia’s Curtis Institute of Music, where he studied with Richard Woodhams. He was a fellowship recipient at the Aspen Music Festival and the Music Academy of the West.

Upon graduation from Curtis in 2003, Wang was offered a position as principal oboe of the Richmond Symphony Orchestra, but turned it down in favor of the same position with the orchestra of the San Francisco Ballet. Shortly after that, he was appointed to the San Francisco Symphony. Two weeks later he won an audition for the Cincinnati Symphony Orchestra, where he served as principal oboe. While in that position, he was a finalist in auditions for principal oboe in the Chicago Symphony Orchestra and Cleveland Orchestra. Wang declined positions with the Grant Park Symphony Orchestra and Houston Grand Opera in order to perform with the Santa Fe Opera as principal oboe. He also won an audition for the Metropolitan Opera's orchestra, electing, instead, to join the New York Philharmonic.

Wang was hired as principal oboist of the New York Philharmonic Orchestra in 2006 by Lorin Maazel. As a concerto soloist, he debuted at the Hong Kong Arts Festival during the orchestra's 2008 tour of Asia and at Carnegie Hall in 2009  as well as numerous appearances at Alice Tully Hall. Notable interpretations of the repertoire include Strauss and Mozart's oboe concertos, Bach's Brandenburg concertos, Christopher Rouse's oboe concerto, and Chen Qigang's Extase. 

As a chamber musician, Wang has performed at the Santa Fe Chamber Music Festival, the La Jolla Music Society, the Chamber Music Society of Lincoln Center, and the Carnegie Hall Stern Auditorium. Wang has recorded with the Poulenc Trio. 

In addition to his performances, Wang is a faculty member at the Manhattan School of Music, where he teaches oboe. He was named an honorary professor at the Central Conservatory of Music in Beijing and the Shanghai Conservatory. Wang has offered master classes at the Juilliard School, Curtis Institute of Music, Cincinnati Conservatory, New York University, The New School, Seoul University, and music conservatories in Singapore, Hanoi, Beijing, and Shanghai.

In 2014, Wang was named “the artist of the year” by the Beijing Music Festival. The award was presented by Deng Xiao Ping's daughter Deng Rong. He was also invited by President Xi to perform with the Orchestre Colonne de France at Versailles to celebrate the 50th anniversary of the establishment of French-Chinese diplomatic relations.

References

External links
Liang Wang's Biography on the New York Philharmonic Website
New York Times article, April 8, 2007 
NPR story, Oboist Liang Wang, September, 16, 2006
Poulenc Sonata, Liang Wang

1980 births
Living people
American oboists
Male oboists
Aspen Music Festival and School alumni
Central Conservatory of Music alumni
Musicians from Qingdao
Educators from Shandong